Events from the year 1901 in Michigan.

Office holders

State office holders
 Governor of Michigan: Aaron T. Bliss (Republican)
 Lieutenant Governor of Michigan: Orrin W. Robinson (Republican) 
 Michigan Attorney General: Horace M. Oren
 Michigan Secretary of State: Fred M. Warner (Republican)
 Speaker of the Michigan House of Representatives: John J. Carton (Republican)
 Chief Justice, Michigan Supreme Court:

Mayors of major cities

 Mayor of Detroit: William C. Maybury (Democrat)
 Mayor of Grand Rapids: George R. Perry
 Mayor of Saginaw: William B. Baum

Federal office holders

 U.S. Senator from Michigan: Julius C. Burrows (Republican)
 U.S. Senator from Michigan: James McMillan (Republican) 
 House District 1: John Blaisdell Corliss (Republican)
 House District 2: Henry C. Smith (Republican)
 House District 3: Washington Gardner (Republican)
 House District 4: Edward L. Hamilton (Republican)
 House District 5: William Alden Smith (Republican)
 House District 6: Samuel William Smith (Republican)
 House District 7: Edgar Weeks (Republican)
 House District 8: Joseph W. Fordney (Republican)
 House District 9: Roswell P. Bishop (Republican)
 House District 10: Rousseau Owen Crump (Republican)/Henry H. Aplin (Republican)
 House District 11: William S. Mesick (Republican)/Archibald B. Darragh (Republican)
 House District 12: Carlos D. Shelden (Republican)

Population

Sports

Baseball

 1901 Detroit Tigers season – The Tigers finished in third place in the inaugural season of the American League with a record of 74–61. Roscoe Miller (23–13) became the Tigers' first 20-game winner. The team's best hitters were shortstop Kid Elberfeld (.308 average) and center fielder Jimmy Barrett (.293 average; 110 runs).
 1901 Michigan Wolverines baseball season - Under head coach Frank Sexton, the Wolverines compiled a 13–8 record (8–2 in conference) and won the Western Conference championship. Edwin McGinnis was the team captain.

American football

 1901 Michigan Wolverines football team – In their first year under head coach Fielding H. Yost, the team compiled a perfect 11–0 record, outscored its opponents by a combined total of 550 to 0, and defeated Stanford by a 49 to 0 score in the inaugural Rose Bowl game.
 1901 Michigan Agricultural Aggies football team – Under head coach George Denman, the Aggies compiled a 3–4–1 record and outscored their opponents 120 to 94.
 1901 Michigan State Normal Normalites football team - Under head coach Clayton Teetzel, the Normalites compiled a record of 3–5 and were outscored by a combined total of 167 to 58. Phillip E. Dennis was the team captain. 
 1901 Detroit Titans football team – Under head coach John C. Mackey, the team compiled a 3–3 record and outscored its opponents by a combined total of 66 to 58.

Chronology of events
 January 1 - Aaron T. Bliss, a Republican from Saginaw, was sworn in as Governor of Michigan in a ceremony in Lansing.
 May 1 - U.S. Representative Rousseau Owen Crump, who represented Michigan's 10th congressional district, died in office.
 October 15 - Henry H. Aplin is seated to fill the vacancy left in the United States House of Representatives by Rousseau Owen Crump's death.

Births
 March 3 - Gwen Wakeling, Academy Award-winning costume designer, in Detroit
 March 25 - Evo Anton DeConcini, Attorney General of Arizona, and a Justice of the Arizona Supreme Court, in Iron Mountain, Michigan
 May 28 - Paul G. Goebel, All-American football end and Mayor of Grand Rapids, in Grand Rapids
 August 15 - Les Sweetland, Major League Baseball pitcher from 1927 to 1931, in St. Ignace, Michigan
 August 15 - Jack Fleischman, American football lineman, in Monroe, Michigan
 October 10 - John R. Emens, President of Ball State University from 1945 to 1968, in Prattville, Michigan
 November 13 - Werner Emmanuel Bachmann, chemist and pioneer in steroid synthesis, in Detroit
 Date unknown - Leonard Peter Schultz, ichthyologist and expert on shark attacks, in Albion, Michigan
 Date unknown - Nell Scott, first woman to serve in Alaska Territorial Legislature, in Marengo, Michigan
 Date unknown - Forman Brown, leader in puppet theater and early gay novelist, in Otsego, Michigan
 Date unknown - Douglas V. Steere, professor of philosophy and Quaker ecumenist, in Harbor Beach, Michigan

Deaths
 March 11 - Charles T. Gorham, one of the founders of the Republican party, an anti-slavery activist, a division commander in the Michigan Militia, United States Ambassador to the Netherlands, Assistant Secretary of the Interior, at age 89 in Marshall, Michigan
 March 18 - Mark S. Brewer, former U.S. Congressman and Civil Service Commissioner, at age 64 in Washington, D.C.
 March 26 - George Willard, former U.S. Congressman who was instrumental in opening the University of Michigan to women, in Battle Creek, Michigan
 May 1 - Rousseau Owen Crump, U.S. Representatives (1895-1901), died in office at age 57 in West Bay City
 June 18 - Hazen S. Pingree, former Mayor of Detroit and Governor of Michigan, while traveling in London, England
 October 29 - Leon Czolgosz, assassin of Pres. William McKinley and a native of Alpena, Michigan, in electric chair

See also
 History of Michigan
 History of Detroit

References